Walter Leonard Arnstein (1930-2019) was a German-born American historian who was Professor of History Emeritus and Jubilee Professor of the Liberal Arts and Sciences Emeritus at the University of Illinois at Urbana-Champaign. He specialised in the history of Victorian Britain.

In 2001, he received a festschrift in his honor, titled Splendidly Victorian, and edited by Michael Shirley and Todd Larson.

Selected publications
 The Bradlaugh Case: A Study in Late Victorian Opinion and Politics (1965, 1984)
 Britain, Yesterday and Today: 1830 to the Present (1966, 2018)
 Queen Victoria (2003)

References

External links
Obituary for Walter Arnstein | Owens Funeral Home

1930 births
University of Illinois Urbana-Champaign faculty
2019 deaths
Date of birth missing
Date of death missing
Place of birth missing
Place of death missing
20th-century American historians
Historians of the United Kingdom